List of people from West Sumatra:

Individuals on this list are either native-born West Sumatra or emigrants who have chosen West Sumatra as their permanent home.

Actors
Dorce Gamalama (born 1963), actress, transsexual pop singer, presenter, and comedian (Solok)

Authors
Djamaluddin Adinegoro (1904–1967), reporter, writer, and political analyst (Sawahlunto)

Lawyers and jurists
Carl Langbehn (1901-1944), German lawyer and politician, who joined the Nazi Party in 1933. In 1944 he met British officials in Switzerland in order to determine options for a German surrender. Upon his return to Germany he was imprisoned by the Gestapo and later sentenced to death. (Padang)
Saldi Isra (1968-), Indonesian Constitutional Court Justice.

Political figures
Dolf Joekes (1884-1962), Dutch politician, Minister of Social Affairs of the Netherlands, Minister of Health of the Netherlands
Patrialis Akbar (born 1958), lawyer, Minister of Justice and Human Rights (Padang)
Azwar Anas  (born 1931), former governor of West Sumatra, former Coordinating Minister for People's Welfare (Padang)
Assaat (1904–1976), former president Republic of Indonesia sat on Yogyakarta part of the United States of Indonesia (Agam Regency)
Gamawan Fauzi (born 1957), Minister of Home Affairs (Solok)
Abdul Halim (1911-1988), 4th Prime Minister of Indonesia (Bukittinggi)
Mohammad Hatta (1902-1980), Indonesia's 1st vice president, later also serving as the country's Prime Minister  (Bukittinggi)
Mohammad Natsir (1908–1993), 5th Prime Minister of Indonesia (Solok)
Rizal Nurdin (1948–2005), 14th and 15th Governor of North Sumatra  (Bukittinggi)
Rizal Ramli  (born 1953), economist, former Coordinating Minister for Economics Affairs and Minister of Finance (Padang)
Rasuna Said (1910–1965), nationalist political leader, and the first female minister of Indonesia (Agam Regency)
Chairul Saleh (1916–1967), government minister and 3rd vice prime minister of Indonesia (Sawahlunto)
Agus Salim (1884-1954), diplomat, foreign minister between 1947 and 1949 (Bukittinggi)
Tifatul Sembiring (born 1961), chairman of the conservative and Islamic Prosperous Justice Party and Minister of Communication and Information (Bukittinggi)
Sutan Sjahrir (1909—1966), 1st prime minister of Indonesia (Padang Panjang)
Tarmizi Taher (born 1936), former Minister of Religious Affairs (Padang)
Jusuf Wanandi (born 1937), vice general secretary of Golongan Karya party (Sawahlunto)
Muhammad Yamin (1903–1962), former Information Minister, Minister of Education and Culture and Minister of Justice (Sawahlunto)

West Sumatra